World Forge was a Russian video game developer located in Voronezh, Russia. The company was founded late 2004 and it employed about 50 people in 2008.

Released games
Ancient Wars: Sparta (2007, real-time strategy)
Fate of Hellas (2008, real-time strategy; released in some territories as Great War Nations: The Spartans)
The Golden Horde (2008, real-time strategy; released in some territories as Great War Nations: The Mongols)
Sparta 2: Alexander the Great (2009, real-time strategy; released in some territories as Age of Alexander)

Cancelled games
Battle for Atlantis (real-time strategy)

External links
 Official website

Defunct video game companies of Russia
Video game companies established in 2004
Video game companies disestablished in 2009
Video game development companies
Companies based in Voronezh
2004 establishments in Russia
Video game companies of Russia